Juwata International Airport  is an international airport in Tarakan, North Kalimantan, Indonesia. It is located on the island of Tarakan which is off the coast of Borneo. The airport was the main Allied objective during the Battle of Tarakan (1945). The airport is planned to be a transit hub for people from other countries such as Malaysia, Brunei and Philippines who is going to travel to other cities in Indonesia. Juwata Airport is a destination point of the ASEAN Single Aviation Market under Protocol I and II.

The airport area and runway is also shared with Suharnoko Harbani Air Force Base, a Type A airbase of the TNI-AU (Indonesian Air Force). The airbase is named after the former Minister of Industry of Indonesia, Suharnoko Harbani, who was also formerly an Air Force officer. Formed in 2006,  the establishment of this air base is essentially part of the strategy and efforts to realize the defense of the country from the potential and development of threats that will threaten the Indonesia as well as the organization's demands from the Air Force Operations Command II in Makassar to facilitate control of its duties. Before the formation of the Air Base, there was already an Indonesian Air Force post which was under the Balikpapan Air Force Base but due to the development of situation and tension with Malaysia in Ambalat, the leadership of the Air Force decided to form a new airbase. Due to the airport is used both by military and civil aviation, so the apron is also used together. In July 2014, the airport authority initials to build 183 meters taxiway to the military apron which can accommodate 4 Sukhoi and 2 Hercules together and the project is predicted to be finished in December 2014.

During the 2010 Tarakan riot, negotiation between communities to end the conflict was held here.

History 
Juwata Airport was built during the Dutch colonial period and was used as a military base for Dutch warplanes. On January 11, 1942, Juwata Airport was also recorded as part of history, as the place where the first Japanese army fighter aircraft landed in Indonesia. After independence, the airport initially operated as a pioneer airport using only small planes and in early 2000, Juwata Airport was upgraded to an airport with a runway length of 1,850 meters, allowing the airport to accommodate mid-sized jets such as the Airbus A330. Due to its strategic geographical location, the airport was one of the earliest international airport in Kalimantan, with routes to Zamboanga in the Philippines and Tawau, Malaysia since the early 1970s.

Terminal 
Juwata Airport has a runway area of 2,250 x 45 meters, 2 taxiways of area 82 m x 23 m each with another taxiway of area 176.59 m x 23 m connecting to the air force base. The airport have been developed both on the air side and the ground side. On the air side of the apron has been expanded from the original 335 m x 70 m into 335 m x 97 m. While on the land side of the passenger terminal has been greatly expanded into 12 440 m2 from the original 2,532 m2. Vehicle parking facility was also expanded into an area of 14,000 m2 from the original 1000 m2. The capacity of the airport also increased The old terminal was previously only able to serve 600 passengers daily, while the new terminal are able to serve 2,000 passengers daily. The new terminal was officially inaugurated on 23 March 2016 by President Joko Widodo.

Airlines and destinations

Passenger

Cargo airlines

References

External links
 

Airports in North Kalimantan
Indonesian Air Force bases